Banbridge Hockey Club is a hockey club based in Banbridge, County Down, Northern Ireland. The club was formed in 1897.

Grounds
The club's first home was at Millmount Green, off the Lurgan Road in Banbridge. In 1949, the club purchased grounds at Castlewellan Road. These continued to be used until 1998 when the need for an artificial-turf pitch meant a move to the new Banbridge District Council facilities at Havelock Park. In March 2007, plans were announced for the laying of a new replacement water-based surface.

Notable players

Men's internationals
 
Edgar McCall was the first Banbridge player to be awarded an international cap when he represented Ireland against Wales in 1900. Over thirty Banbridge players have been selected for Ireland. These include:

Honours
 Irish Senior Cup (11 wins)
 1906–07, 1922–23, 1923–24, 1925–26, 1947–48, 1955–56, 1981–82, 1983–84, 1985–86, 2014–15, 2016–17
 Irish Hockey League (1 win)
 2016–17
 Anderson Cup (list is incomplete)
 1919–20, 1920–21, 1923–24, 1926–27, 1927–28, 1930–31, 1932–33, 1943–44, 1944–45, 1972–73, 1973–74, 1974–75, 1981–82, 1983–84, 1985–86, 1990–91, 1991–92, 1997–98, 2005–06, 2008–09, 2009–10, 2014–15
 EuroHockey Club Trophy
 1985
 Irish Junior Cup (6 wins)
 1928–29, 1948–49, 1952–53, 1988–89, 1993–94, 2004–05.
 Kirk Cup (22 wins)
 1905–06, 1908–09, 1909–10, 1910–11, 1912–13, 1913–14, 1919–20, 1925–26, 1926–27, 1934–35, 1937–38, 1949–50, 1950–51, 1956–57, 1982–83, 1985–86, 1986–87, 1987–88, 2005–06, 2010–11., 2014–15, 2018-19, 2019-20
 Ulster Senior League (19 wins – list is incomplete)
 1901–02, 1903–04, 1908–09, 1909–10, 1910–11, 1912–13, 1913–14, 1925–26, 1961–62, 1985–86, 1986–87, 1987–88, 1988–89, 2012–13.
 (Shared) 1957–58

Sources

External links
 Banbridge Hockey Club

Field hockey clubs in Northern Ireland
Sports clubs in County Down
Field hockey clubs established in 1897
1897 establishments in Ireland
Men's Irish Hockey League teams
Hockey Club